Kokoda Crescent is a 1988 Australian film about World War Two veterans who seek revenge against the drug pushers responsible for the death of one of their grandchildren.

Release
The movie was not released theatrically and went straight to video.

References

External links

Kokoda Crescent at Oz Movies

Australian drama films
1988 films
Films directed by Ted Robinson (TV director)
1980s English-language films
1980s Australian films